Londrina – Gov. José Richa Airport  is the airport serving Londrina, Brazil. It is named after José Richa (1934–2003), former Mayor of Londrina and Governor of Paraná.

It is operated by CCR.

History
The airport was commissioned in 1936 but only in 1956 the runway was paved. In 1958 a new terminal, a project by Remo Veronesi, was opened, and in 2000 it was extensively renovated and enlarged.

Previously operated by Infraero, on April 7, 2021 CCR won a 30-year concession to operate the airport.

Airlines and destinations

Accidents and incidents
13 December 1950: a VASP Douglas C-47A-90-DL registration PP-SPT while on initial climb from Londrina lost engine power, crashed and caught fire. There were 3 ground fatalities.
14 September 1969: a VASP Douglas C-47B-45-DK registration PP-SPP operating flight 555 took off from Londrina to São Paulo-Congonhas but due to a feathered propeller, had to return to the origin. While on approach for landing, the aircraft made a sharp left turn and crashed. All 20 passengers and crew died.

Statistics

Access

See also

List of airports in Brazil

References

External links

Airports in Paraná (state)
Airports established in 1936
Londrina